Sebring Sports Cars is a British electric sports car manufacturer, based near Stratford Upon Avon, Warwickshire. They produce a range of retro-inspired open-top electric sports cars and a coupe.

Range
Sebring Sports Cars hand builds a range of electric sports cars using fibreglass bodywork, the style reminiscent of the classic Austin-Healey 3000 sports cars produced between 1959 and 1967 and the Porsche 356 (coupe and speedster).

The name derives from the Sebring International Raceway in the USA, at which Austin-Healey cars were very successful.

Previously a kit car company, Sebrings are now exclusively factory built in Long Marston, Warwickshire.

The brand was acquired in 2021 by the Vital Spark Group Ltd.

References

External links
  Sebring Sports Cars
 Vital Spark Group

Car manufacturers of the United Kingdom
Sports car manufacturers
2021 mergers and acquisitions